Panama is a predominantly Christian country, a result of the Spanish conquistadors and centuries of missionaries. Like the rest of Latin America, the Catholicism of the conquest began to shift as aspects of indigenous, African and other spiritualities were acculturated. In recent decades, however, Evangelical Protestant churches, especially those denominations strongest in North America, have been gaining ground.

Numbers
Statistics are unclear as to the exact percentage of Panama's population that are Christian, though the country has large religious minorities who adhere to Buddhism, Islam, Judaism, and indigenous religions. Most numbers consider around four-fifths of Panama's population to be Catholic, and about 19% to be Evangelical Protestant.

Local Christian Symbols
Like the rest of the continent, Panamanians celebrate Carnaval before Lent, and towns and regions have their own festivals at different parts of the year. The most famous of these is the festival of the Cristo Negro, the Black Jesus Christ, in the town of Portobelo in the Colón Province on October 21. In Las Tablas and Herrera provinces, festivals are held for the Jesus Cristo de Azuero, named after the peninsula.

See also
Roman Catholicism in Panama

External links
 Religious radio stations in Panama